The Gold Cup Invitational Pace is a harness race for Standardbred pacers age three and older. It is run at a distance of one mile at Mohawk Racetrack in Campbellville, Ontario.

The race has been a permanent fixture at Mohawk Raceway since 2011 but was initially run at Greenwood Raceway in Toronto and would also be hosted in various years by both Woodbine Racetrack and Mohawk Raceway.

Records
 Most wins by a driver
 4 – Douglas S. Brown (1981, 1990, 1996, 1998) & Paul MacDonell (1995, 1997, 2001, 2009)

 Most wins by a trainer
 6 – William G. Robinson (1978, 1981, 1994, 1996, 1999, 2002)

 Stakes record
 1:47 1/5 – Always B Miki  (2016) (new Canadian record)

Winners of the Gold Cup Invitational Pace

References

Recurring sporting events established in 1976
1936 establishments in Ontario
Mohawk Racetrack
Woodbine Racetrack
Greenwood Raceway